Sheena Drummie is a Scottish curler.

At the national level, she is a Scottish women's champion curler (1988).

Teams

References

External links
 

Living people
Scottish female curlers
Scottish curling champions
Year of birth missing (living people)
Place of birth missing (living people)